The McDonnell Douglas F-15 Eagle is an American twin-engine, all-weather tactical fighter aircraft designed by McDonnell Douglas (now part of Boeing).  Following reviews of proposals, the United States Air Force (USAF) selected McDonnell Douglas's design in 1969 to meet the service's need for a dedicated air superiority fighter. The Eagle first flew in July 1972, and entered service in 1976. It is among the most successful modern fighters, with over 100 victories and no losses in aerial combat, with the majority of the kills by the Israeli Air Force.

The Eagle has been exported to numerous countries including Israel, Japan, and Saudi Arabia. The F-15 was originally envisioned as a pure air-superiority aircraft. Its design included a secondary ground-attack capability that was largely unused. The aircraft design proved flexible enough that an improved all-weather strike derivative, the F-15E Strike Eagle, was later developed, entered service in 1989 and has been exported to several nations. Several additional F-15 variants have been produced.

The USAF had planned to replace all of its air superiority F-15s with the Lockheed Martin F-22 in the 2010s, but the severely reduced F-22 procurement forced the USAF to operate the F-15C/D into the 2020s. The F-15E Strike Eagle is expected to continue operating in the USAF into the 2030s. The F-15 remains in service with numerous countries, with production of enhanced variants still ongoing.

Development

Early studies
The F-15 can trace its origins to the early Vietnam War, when the U.S. Air Force and U.S. Navy fought each other over future tactical aircraft. Defense Secretary Robert McNamara was pressing for both services to use as many common aircraft as possible, even if performance compromises were involved. As part of this policy, the USAF and Navy had embarked on the TFX (F-111) program, aiming to deliver a medium-range interdiction aircraft for the Air Force that would also serve as a long-range interceptor aircraft for the Navy.

In January 1965, Secretary McNamara asked the Air Force to consider a new low-cost tactical fighter design for short-range roles and close air support to replace several types like the F-100 Super Sabre and various light bombers then in service. Several existing designs could fill this role; the Navy favored the Douglas A-4 Skyhawk and LTV A-7 Corsair II, which were pure attack aircraft, while the Air Force was more interested in the Northrop F-5 fighter with a secondary attack capability. The A-4 and A-7 were more capable in the attack role, while the F-5 less so, but could defend itself. If the Air Force chose a pure attack design, maintaining air superiority would be a priority for a new airframe. The next month, a report on light tactical aircraft suggested the Air Force purchase the F-5 or A-7, and consider a new higher-performance aircraft to ensure its air superiority. This point was reinforced after the loss of two Republic F-105 Thunderchief aircraft to obsolete MiG-17s attacking the Thanh Hóa Bridge on 4 April 1965.

In April 1965, Harold Brown, at that time director of the Department of Defense Research and Engineering, stated the favored position was to consider the F-5 and begin studies of an "F-X". These early studies envisioned a production run of 800 to 1,000 aircraft and stressed maneuverability over speed; it also stated that the aircraft would not be considered without some level of ground-attack capability. On 1 August, General Gabriel Disosway took command of Tactical Air Command and reiterated calls for the F-X, but lowered the required performance from Mach 3.0 to 2.5 to lower costs.

An official requirements document for an air superiority fighter was finalized in October 1965, and sent out as a request for proposals to 13 companies on 8 December. Meanwhile, the Air Force chose the A-7 over the F-5 for the support role on 5 November 1965, giving further impetus for an air superiority design as the A-7 lacked any credible air-to-air capability.

Eight companies responded with proposals. Following a downselect, four companies were asked to provide further developments. In total, they developed some 500 design concepts. When the proposals were studied in July 1966, the aircraft were roughly the size and weight of the TFX F-111, and like that aircraft, were designs that could not be considered an air-superiority fighter.

Smaller, lighter
Through this period, studies of combat over Vietnam were producing worrying results. Theory had stressed long-range combat using missiles and optimized aircraft for this role. The result was highly loaded aircraft with large radar and excellent speed, but limited maneuverability and often lacking a gun. The canonical example was the McDonnell Douglas F-4 Phantom II, used by the USAF, USN, and U.S. Marine Corps to provide air superiority over Vietnam, the only fighter with enough power, range, and maneuverability to be given the primary task of dealing with the threat of Soviet fighters while flying with visual engagement rules.

In practice, due to policy and practical reasons, aircraft were closing to visual range and maneuvering, placing the larger US aircraft at a disadvantage to the much less expensive day fighters such as the MiG-21. Missiles proved to be much less reliable than predicted, especially at close range. Although improved training and the introduction of the M61 Vulcan cannon on the F-4 did much to address the disparity, these early outcomes led to considerable re-evaluation of the 1963 Project Forecast doctrine. This led to John Boyd's energy–maneuverability theory, which stressed that extra power and maneuverability were key aspects of a successful fighter design and these were more important than outright speed. Through tireless championing of the concepts and good timing with the "failure" of the initial F-X project, the "fighter mafia" pressed for a lightweight day fighter that could be built and operated in large numbers to ensure air superiority.

By this time, the Navy had decided the F-111 would not meet their requirements and began the development of a new dedicated fighter design, the VFAX program. In May 1966, McNamara again asked the forces to study the designs and see whether the VFAX would meet the Air Force's F-X needs. The resulting studies took 18 months and concluded that the desired features were too different; the Navy stressed loiter time and mission flexibility, while the Air Force was now looking primarily for maneuverability.

Focus on air superiority
In 1967, the Soviet Union revealed the Mikoyan-Gurevich MiG-25 at the Domodedovo airfield near Moscow. The MiG-25 was designed as a high-speed, high-altitude interceptor aircraft, and made many performance tradeoffs to excel in this role. Among these was the requirement for very high speed, over Mach 2.8, which demanded the use of stainless steel instead of aluminum for many parts of the aircraft. The added weight demanded a much larger wing to allow the aircraft to operate at the required high altitudes. However, to observers, it appeared outwardly similar to the very large F-X studies, an aircraft with high speed and a large wing offering high maneuverability, leading to serious concerns throughout the Department of Defense and the various arms that the US was being outclassed. The MiG-23 was likewise a subject of concern, and it was generally believed to be a better aircraft than the F-4. The F-X would outclass the MiG-23, but now the MiG-25 appeared to be superior in speed, ceiling, and endurance to all existing US fighters, even the F-X. Thus, an effort to improve the F-X followed.

Both Headquarters USAF and TAC continued to call for a multipurpose aircraft, while both Disosway and Air Chief of Staff Bruce K. Holloway pressed for a pure air-superiority design that would be able to meet the expected performance of the MiG-25. During the same period, the Navy had ended its VFAX program and instead accepted a proposal from Grumman for a smaller and more maneuverable design known as VFX, later becoming the Grumman F-14 Tomcat. VFX was considerably closer to the evolving F-X requirements. The Air Force in-fighting was eventually ended by the worry that the Navy's VFAX would be forced on them; in May 1968, it was stated that "We finally decided – and I hope there is no one who still disagrees – that this aircraft is going to be an air superiority fighter".

In September 1968, a request for proposals was released to major aerospace companies. It also called for a twin-engined arrangement, as this was believed to respond to throttle changes more rapidly and might offer commonality with the Navy's VFX program. However, details of the avionics were left largely undefined, as whether to build a larger aircraft with a powerful radar that could detect the enemy at longer ranges was not clear, or alternatively a smaller aircraft that would make detecting it more difficult for the enemy.

Four companies submitted proposals, with the Air Force eliminating General Dynamics and awarding contracts to Fairchild Republic, North American Rockwell, and McDonnell Douglas for the definition phase in December 1968. The companies submitted technical proposals by June 1969. The Air Force announced the selection of McDonnell Douglas on 23 December 1969. The winning design resembled the twin-tailed F-14, but with fixed wings; both designs were based on configurations studied in wind-tunnel testing by NASA.

The Eagle's initial versions were the F-15 single-seat variant and TF-15 twin-seat variant. (After the F-15C was first flown, the designations were changed to "F-15A" and "F-15B"). These versions would be powered by new Pratt & Whitney F100 engines to achieve a combat thrust-to-weight ratio in excess of 1:1. A proposed 25-mm Ford-Philco GAU-7 cannon with caseless ammunition suffered development problems. It was dropped in favor of the standard M61 Vulcan gun. The F-15 used conformal carriage of four Sparrow missiles like the Phantom. The fixed wing was put onto a flat, wide fuselage that also provided an effective lifting surface. The first F-15A flight was made on 27 July 1972, with the first flight of the two-seat F-15B following in July 1973.

The F-15 has a "look-down/shoot-down" radar that can distinguish low-flying moving targets from ground clutter. It would use computer technology with new controls and displays to lower pilot workload and require only one pilot to save weight. Unlike the F-14 or F-4, the F-15 has only a single canopy frame with clear vision forward. The USAF introduced the F-15 as "the first dedicated USAF air-superiority fighter since the North American F-86 Sabre".

The F-15 was favored by customers such as the Israel and Japan air arms. Criticism from the fighter mafia that the F-15 was too large to be a dedicated dogfighter and too expensive to procure in large numbers, led to the Lightweight Fighter (LWF) program, which led to the USAF General Dynamics F-16 Fighting Falcon and the middle-weight Navy McDonnell Douglas F/A-18 Hornet.

Further development
The single-seat F-15C and two-seat F-15D models entered production in 1978 and conducted their first flights in February and June of that year. The increased takeoff weight allows internal fuel, a full weapons load, conformal fuel tanks, and three external fuel tanks to be carried. The APG-63 radar uses a programmable signal processor (PSP), enabling the radar to be reprogrammable for additional purposes such as the addition of new armaments and equipment. The PSP was the first of its kind in the world, and the upgraded APG-63 radar was the first radar to use it. Other improvements included strengthened landing gear, a new digital central computer, and an overload warning system, which allows the pilot to fly up to 9 g at all weights.

The F-15 Multistage Improvement Program (MSIP) was initiated in February 1983 with the first production MSIP F-15C produced in 1985. Improvements included an upgraded central computer; a Programmable Armament Control Set, allowing for advanced versions of the AIM-7, AIM-9, and AIM-120A missiles; and an expanded Tactical Electronic Warfare System that provides improvements to the ALR-56C radar warning receiver and ALQ-135 countermeasure set. The final 43 F-15Cs included the Hughes APG-70 radar developed for the F-15E; these are sometimes referred as Enhanced Eagles. Earlier MSIP F-15Cs with the APG-63 were upgraded to the APG-63(V)1 to improve maintainability and to perform similar to the APG-70. Existing F-15s were retrofitted with these improvements.

In 1979, McDonnell Douglas and F-15 radar manufacturer, Hughes, teamed to privately develop a strike fighter version of the F-15. This version competed in the Air Force's Dual-Role Fighter competition starting in 1982. The F-15E strike variant was selected for production over General Dynamics' competing F-16XL in 1984. Beginning in 1985, F-15C and D models were equipped with the improved P&W F100-PW-220 engine and digital engine controls, providing quicker throttle response, reduced wear, and lower fuel consumption. Starting in 1997, original F100-PW-100 engines were upgraded to a similar configuration with the designation F100-PW-220E starting.

Beginning in 2007, 179 USAF F-15Cs would be retrofitted with the AN/APG-63(V)3 Active Electronically Scanned Array radar. A significant number of F-15s are to be equipped with the Joint Helmet Mounted Cueing System. Lockheed Martin is working on an IRST system for the F-15C. A follow-on upgrade called the Eagle passive/active warning survivability system (EPAWSS) was planned, but remained unfunded. Boeing was selected in October 2015 to serve as prime contractor for the EPAWSS, with BAE Systems selected as a subcontractor.  The EPAWSS is an all-digital system with advanced electronic countermeasures, radar warning, and increased chaff and flare capabilities in a smaller footprint than the 1980s-era Tactical Electronic Warfare System.  More than 400 F-15Cs and F-15Es will have the system installed.

In September 2015, Boeing unveiled its 2040C Eagle upgrade, designed to keep the F-15 relevant through 2040.  Seen as a necessity because of the low numbers of F-22s procured, the upgrade builds upon the company's F-15SE Silent Eagle concept with low-observable features.  Most improvements focus on lethality including quad-pack munitions racks to double its missile load to 16, conformal fuel tanks for extended range, "Talon HATE" communications pod to communicate with fifth-generation fighters, the APG-63(v)3 AESA radar, a long-range infrared search and track sensor, and BAE Systems' EPAWSS systems.

Design

Overview

The F-15 has an all-metal semi-monocoque fuselage with a large-cantilever, shoulder-mounted wing. The wing planform of the F-15 suggests a modified cropped delta shape with a leading-edge sweepback angle of 45°. Ailerons and a simple high-lift flap are located on the trailing edge. No leading-edge maneuvering flaps are used. This complication was avoided by the combination of low wing loading and fixed leading-edge camber that varies with spanwise position along the wing. Airfoil thickness ratios vary from 6% at the root to 3% at the tip.

The empennage is of metal and composite construction, with twin aluminium/composite material honeycomb structure vertical stabilizers with boron-composite skin, resulting in an exceptionally thin tailplane and rudders.  Composite horizontal all-moving tails outboard of the vertical stabilizers move independently to provide roll control in some flight maneuvers.  The F-15 has a spine-mounted air brake and retractable tricycle landing gear. It is powered by two Pratt & Whitney F100 axial compressor turbofan engines with afterburners, mounted side by side in the fuselage and fed by rectangular inlets with variable intake ramps. The cockpit is mounted high in the forward fuselage with a one-piece windscreen and large canopy for increased visibility and a 360° field of view for the pilot.  The airframe began to incorporate advanced superplastically formed titanium components in the 1980s.

The F-15's maneuverability is derived from low wing loading (weight to wing area ratio) with a high thrust-to-weight ratio, enabling the aircraft to turn tightly without losing airspeed. At certain speeds, the dynamic thrust output of the dual engines is greater than the aircraft's combat weight and drag, so it has the ability to accelerate vertically. The weapons and flight-control systems are designed so that one person can safely and effectively perform air-to-air combat. The A and C models are single-seat variants; these were the main air-superiority versions produced. B and D models add a second seat behind the pilot for training. E models use the second seat for a weapon systems officer. Visibly, the F-15 has a unique feature vis-à-vis other modern fighter aircraft; it does not have the distinctive "turkey feather" aerodynamic exhaust petals covering its engine nozzles. Following problems during development of its exhaust petal design, including dislodgment during flight, the decision was made to remove them, resulting in a 3% aerodynamic drag increase.

The F-15 was shown to be capable of controlled flight with only one wing. After a mid-air collision which removed a complete wing the pilot quickly learned how to fly the aircraft and land it safely. Subsequent wind-tunnel tests on a one-wing model confirmed that controllable flight was only possible within a very limited speed range of +/- 20 knots and angle of attack variation of +/- 20 degrees. The event resulted in research into damage adaptive technology and a system called "Intelligent Flight Control System".

Avionics

A multimission avionics system includes a head-up display (HUD), advanced radar, AN/ASN-109 inertial guidance system, flight instruments, ultra high frequency communications, and tactical air navigation system and instrument landing system receivers. It also has an internally mounted, tactical electronic warfare system, Identification friend or foe system, an electronic countermeasures suite, and a central digital computer.

The HUD projects all essential flight information gathered by the integrated avionics system. This display, visible in any light condition, provides the pilot information necessary to track and destroy an enemy aircraft without having to look down at cockpit instruments.

The F-15's versatile APG-63 and 70 pulse-Doppler radar systems can look up at high-flying targets and look-down/shoot-down at low-flying targets without being confused by ground clutter. These radars can detect and track aircraft and small high-speed targets at distances beyond visual range down to close range, and at altitudes down to treetop level. The radar feeds target information into the central computer for effective weapons delivery. For close-in dogfights, the radar automatically acquires enemy aircraft, and this information is projected on the head-up display. The F-15's electronic warfare system provides both threat warning (radar warning receiver) and automatic countermeasures against selected threats.

Weaponry and external stores

A variety of air-to-air weaponry can be carried by the F-15. An automated weapon system enables the pilot to release weapons effectively and safely, using the head-up display and the avionics and weapons controls located on the engine throttles or control stick. When the pilot changes from one weapon system to another, visual guidance for the selected weapon automatically appears on the head-up display.

The Eagle can be armed with combinations of four different air-to-air weapons: AIM-7F/M Sparrow missiles or AIM-120 AMRAAM advanced medium-range air-to-air missiles on its lower fuselage corners, AIM-9L/M Sidewinder or AIM-120 AMRAAM missiles on two pylons under the wings, and an internal  M61 Vulcan Gatling gun in the right wing root.

Low-drag conformal fuel tanks (CFTs) were developed for the F-15C and D models. They can be attached to the sides of the engine air intakes under each wing and are designed to the same load factors and airspeed limits as the basic aircraft. These tanks slightly degrade performance by increasing aerodynamic drag and cannot be jettisoned in-flight. However, they cause less drag than conventional external tanks. Each conformal tank can hold 750 U.S. gallons (2,840 L) of fuel. These CFTs increase range and reduce the need for in-flight refueling. All external stations for munitions remain available with the tanks in use. Moreover, Sparrow or AMRAAM missiles can be attached to the corners of the CFTs. The 57 FIS based at Keflavik NAS, Iceland, was the only C-model squadron to use CFTs on a regular basis due to its extended operations over the North Atlantic. With the closure of the 57 FIS, the F-15E is the only variant to carry them on a routine basis. CFTs have also been sold to Israel and Saudi Arabia.

Upgrades

The McDonnell Douglas F-15E Strike Eagle is a two-seat, dual-role, totally integrated fighter for all-weather, air-to-air, and deep interdiction missions. The rear cockpit is upgraded to include four multipurpose cathode ray tube displays for aircraft systems and weapons management. The digital, triple-redundant Lear Siegler aircraft flight control system permits coupled automatic terrain following, enhanced by a ring-laser gyro inertial navigation system. For low-altitude, high-speed penetration and precision attack on tactical targets at night or in adverse weather, the F-15E carries a high-resolution APG-70 radar and LANTIRN pods to provide thermography. The newest F-15E version is the F-15 Advanced, which features fly-by-wire controls.

The APG-63(V)2 active electronically scanned array (AESA) radar has been retrofitted to 18 U.S. Air Force F-15C aircraft. This upgrade includes most of the new hardware from the APG-63(V)1, but adds an AESA to provide increased pilot situation awareness. The AESA radar has an exceptionally agile beam, providing nearly instantaneous track updates and enhanced multitarget tracking capability. The APG-63(V)2 is compatible with current F-15C weapon loads and enables pilots to take full advantage of AIM-120 AMRAAM capabilities, simultaneously guiding multiple missiles to several targets widely spaced in azimuth, elevation, or range. The further improved APG-63(V)3 AESA radar is expected to be fitted to 179 F-15C aircraft; the first upgraded aircraft was delivered in October 2010. The ZAP (Zone Acquisition Program) missile launch envelope has been integrated into the operational flight program system of all U.S. F-15 aircraft, providing dynamic launch zone and launch acceptability region information for missiles to the pilot by display cues in real-time.

Operational history

Introduction and early service

The largest operator of the F-15 is the United States Air Force. The first Eagle, an F-15B, was delivered on 13 November 1974. In January 1976, the first Eagle destined for a combat squadron, the 555th TFS, was delivered. These initial aircraft carried the Hughes Aircraft (now Raytheon) APG-63 radar.

The first kill by an F-15 was scored by Israeli Air Force (IAF) ace Moshe Melnik in 1979. During IAF raids against Palestinian factions in Lebanon in 1979–1981, F-15As reportedly downed 13 Syrian MiG-21s and two Syrian MiG-25s. Israeli F-15As and Bs participated as escorts in Operation Opera, an air strike on an Iraqi nuclear reactor. In the 1982 Lebanon War, Israeli F-15s were credited with 41 Syrian aircraft destroyed (23 MiG-21s and 17 MiG-23s, and one Aérospatiale SA.342L Gazelle helicopter).  During Operation Mole Cricket 19, Israeli F-15s and F-16s together shot down 82 Syrian fighters (MiG-21s, MiG-23s, and MiG-23Ms) without losses.

Israel was the only operator to use and develop the air-to-ground abilities of the air-superiority F-15 variants, doing so because the fighter's range was well beyond other combat aircraft in the Israeli inventory in the 1980s. The first known use of F-15s for a strike mission was during Operation Wooden Leg on 1 October 1985, with six F-15Ds attacking PLO Headquarters in Tunis with two GBU-15 guided bombs per aircraft and two F-15Cs restriking the ruins with six Mk-82 unguided bombs each. This was one of the few times air-superiority F-15s (A/B/C/D models) were used in tactical strike missions. Israeli air-superiority F-15 variants have since been extensively upgraded to carry a wider range of air-to-ground armaments, including JDAM GPS-guided bombs and Popeye missile.

Royal Saudi Air Force F-15C pilots reportedly shot down two Iranian Air Force F-4E Phantom IIs in a skirmish on 5 June 1984.

Anti-satellite trials

The ASM-135 missile was designed to be a standoff antisatellite (ASAT) weapon, with the F-15 acting as a first stage. The Soviet Union could correlate a U.S. rocket launch with a spy satellite loss, but an F-15 carrying an ASAT would blend in among hundreds of F-15 flights. From January 1984 to September 1986, two F-15As were used as launch platforms for the ASAT missile. The F-15As were modified to carry one ASM-135 on the centerline station with extra equipment within a special centerline pylon. The flight computer was updated to control the zoom-climb and missile release.

The third test flight involved a retired P78-1 solar observatory satellite in a  orbit, which was destroyed by kinetic energy. The pilot, USAF Major Wilbert D. "Doug" Pearson, became the only pilot to destroy a satellite. The ASAT program involved five test launches. The program was officially terminated in 1988.

Gulf War and aftermath
The USAF began deploying F-15C, D, and E model aircraft to the Persian Gulf region in August 1990 for Operations Desert Shield and Desert Storm. During the Gulf War, the F-15 accounted for 36 of the 39 air-to-air victories by U.S. Air Force against Iraqi forces. Iraq has confirmed the loss of 23 of its aircraft in air-to-air combat. The F-15C and D fighters were used in the air-superiority role, while F-15E Strike Eagles were used in air-to-ground attacks mainly at night, hunting modified Scud missile launchers and artillery sites using the LANTIRN system. According to the USAF, its F-15Cs had 34 confirmed kills of Iraqi aircraft during the 1991 Gulf War, most of them by missile fire: five Mikoyan MiG-29s, two MiG-25s, eight MiG-23s, two MiG-21s, two Sukhoi Su-25s, four Sukhoi Su-22s, one Sukhoi Su-7, six Dassault Mirage F1s, one Ilyushin Il-76 cargo aircraft, one Pilatus PC-9 trainer, and two Mil Mi-8 helicopters. Air superiority was achieved in the first three days of the conflict; many of the later kills were reportedly of Iraqi aircraft fleeing to Iran, rather than engaging American aircraft. A Strike Eagle achieved an aerial kill of an Iraqi Mi-8 helicopter with a laser-guided bomb. Two F-15Es were lost to ground fire, another was damaged on the ground by a Scud strike on King Abdulaziz Air Base.

On 11 November 1990, a Royal Saudi Air Force (RSAF) pilot defected to Sudan with an F-15C fighter during Operation Desert Shield. Saudi Arabia paid US$40 million for return of the aircraft three months later. RSAF F-15s shot down two Iraqi Mirage F1s during the Operation Desert storm. One Saudi Arabian F-15C was lost to a crash during the Persian Gulf War in 1991. The IQAF claimed this fighter was part of two USAF F-15Cs that engaged two Iraqi MiG-25PDs, and was hit by an R-40 missile before crashing.

They have since been deployed to support Operation Southern Watch, the patrolling of the Iraqi no-fly zones in Southern Iraq; Operation Provide Comfort in Turkey; in support of NATO operations in Bosnia, and recent air expeditionary force deployments. In 1994, two U.S. Army Sikorsky UH-60 Black Hawks were mistakenly downed by USAF F-15Cs in northern Iraq in a friendly-fire incident. USAF F-15Cs shot down four Yugoslav MiG-29s using AIM-120 and AIM-7 Radar guided missiles during NATO's 1999 intervention in Kosovo, Operation Allied Force.

Structural defects
All F-15s were grounded by the USAF after a Missouri Air National Guard F-15C came apart in flight and crashed on 2 November 2007. The newer F-15E fleet was later cleared for continued operations. The USAF reported on 28 November 2007 that a critical location in the upper longerons on the F-15C was the failure's suspected cause, causing the fuselage forward of the air intakes, including the cockpit and radome, to separate from the airframe.

F-15A through D-model aircraft were grounded until the location received detailed inspections and repairs as needed. The grounding of F-15s received media attention as it began to place strains on the nation's air-defense efforts. The grounding forced some states to rely on their neighboring states' fighters for air-defense protection, and Alaska to depend on Canadian Forces' fighter support.

On 8 January 2008, the USAF Air Combat Command (ACC) cleared a portion of its older F-15 fleet for return to flying status. It also recommended a limited return to flight for units worldwide using the affected models. The accident review board report, which was released on 10 January 2008, stated that analysis of the F-15C wreckage determined that the longeron did not meet drawing specifications, which led to fatigue cracks and finally a catastrophic failure of the remaining support structures and breakup of the aircraft in flight. In a report released on 10 January 2008, nine other F-15s were identified to have similar problems in the longeron. As a result, General John D. W. Corley stated, "the long-term future of the F-15 is in question". On 15 February 2008, ACC cleared all its grounded F-15A/B/C/D fighters for flight pending inspections, engineering reviews, and any needed repairs. ACC also recommended release of other U.S. F-15A/B/C/Ds.

Later service

The F-15 has a combined air-to-air combat record of 104 kills to no losses . The F-15's air superiority versions, the A/B/C/D models, have not suffered any losses to enemy action. Over half of F-15 kills have been achieved by Israeli Air Force pilots.

On 16 September 2009, the last F-15A, an Oregon Air National Guard aircraft, was retired, marking the end of service for the F-15A and F-15B models in the United States.

With the retirement of the F-15A and B models, the F-15C and D models are supplemented in US service by the newer F-22 Raptor. During the 2010s, USAF F-15C/Ds were regularly based overseas with the Pacific Air Forces at Kadena AB in Japan and with the U.S. Air Forces in Europe at RAF Lakenheath in the United Kingdom. Other regular USAF F-15s are operated by ACC as adversary/aggressor platforms at Nellis AFB, Nevada, and by Air Force Materiel Command in test and evaluation roles at Edwards AFB, California, and Eglin AFB, Florida. All remaining combat-coded F-15C/Ds are operated by the Air National Guard.

As of 2006, the USAF was upgrading 178 F-15C/Ds with the AN/APG-63(V)3 AESA radar, and equipping other F-15s with the Joint Helmet Mounted Cueing System. In 2007, the USAF planned to keep 178 F-15C/Ds along with 224 F-15Es in service beyond 2025.

As part of the USAF's FY 2015 budget, the F-15C faced cuts or retirement in response to sequestration. In April 2017, USAF officials announced plans to retire the F-15C/D in the mid-2020s and press more F-16s into roles occupied by the F-15. In December 2018, Bloomberg Government reported that the Pentagon, not the USAF, in its 2020 budget request, would likely request US$1.2 billion for 12 new-built F-15Xs to replace older F-15Cs operated by Air National Guard units. Newly built Eagle IIs will replace F-15C/Ds, as the older airframes had an average age of 37 years by 2021; 75% were beyond their certified service lives leading to groundings from structural issues, and life extensions were deemed too expensive. In 2021, 144 Eagle IIs were planned to primarily fly ANG homeland defense missions, as well as carry outsized standoff weapons in combat. In 2022, it was announced the USAF plan to retire their fleet of F-15C/Ds by 2026. 

The Air Force Magazine stated in 2007 that the F-15E was projected to remain in service for many years because of the model's primary air-to-ground role and the low number of hours on the variant's airframes.

Yemen Civil War
During the Yemeni Civil War (2015–present), Houthis have used R-27T missiles modified to serve as surface-to-air missiles. A video released on 7 January 2018 also shows a modified R-27T hitting a Saudi F-15 on a forward-looking infrared camera. Houthi sources claim to have downed the F-15, although this has been disputed, as the missile apparently proximity detonated, though the F-15 continued to fly in its trajectory seemingly unaffected. Rebels later released footage showing an aircraft wreck, but serial numbers on the wreckage suggested the aircraft was a Panavia Tornado, also operated by Saudi forces. On 8 January, the Saudi admitted the loss of an aircraft but due to technical reasons.

On 21 March 2018, Houthi rebels released a video where they hit and possibly shot down a Saudi F-15 in Saada province. In the video a R-27T air-to-air missile adapted for surface-to-air use was launched and appeared to hit a jet. As in the video of the previous similar hit recorded on 8 January, the target, while clearly hit, did not appear to be downed. Saudi forces confirmed the hit, while saying the jet landed at a Saudi base. Saudi official sources confirmed the incident, reporting that it happened at 3:48 pm local time after a surface-to-air defense missile was launched at the fighter jet from inside Saada airport.

After the Houthi attack on Saudi oil infrastructure on 14 September 2019, Saudi Arabia tasked F-15 fighters armed with missiles to intercept low flying drones, difficult to intercept with ground-based high altitude missile systems like the MIM-104 Patriot with several drones being downed since then. On 2 July 2020, a Saudi F-15 shot down two Houthi Shahed 129 drones above Yemen. On 7 March 2021, during a Houthi attack at several Saudi oil installations, Saudi F-15s shot down several attacking drones using heatseeking AIM-9 Sidewinder missiles, with video evidence showing at least two Samad-3 UAVs and one Qasef-2K downed. On 30 March 2021, a video made by Saudi border guards showed a Saudi F-15 shooting down a Houthi Quasef-2K drone with an AIM-120 AMRAAM fired at short range.

Variants

Basic models

F-15A
Single-seat all-weather air-superiority fighter version, 384 built in 1972–1979
F-15B
Two-seat training version, formerly designated TF-15A, 61 built in 1972–1979
F-15C
Improved single-seat all-weather air-superiority fighter version, 483 built in 1979–1985. The last 43 F-15Cs were upgraded with AN/APG-70 radar and later the AN/APG-63(V)1 radar.
F-15D
Two-seat training version, 92 built in 1979–1985.
F-15J
Single-seat all-weather air-superiority fighter version for the Japan Air Self-Defense Force 139 built under license in Japan by Mitsubishi Heavy Industries in 1981–1997, two built in St. Louis.
F-15DJ
Two-seat training version for the Japan Air Self-Defense Force. 12 built in St. Louis, and 25 built under license in Japan by Mitsubishi in the period 1981–1997.
F-15N Sea Eagle
The F-15N was a carrier-capable variant proposed in the early 1970s to the U.S. Navy as an alternative to the heavier and, at the time, considered to be "riskier" technology program, the Grumman F-14 Tomcat.  It did not have a long range radar or the long range missiles used by the F-14. The F-15N-PHX was another proposed naval version capable of carrying the AIM-54 Phoenix missile, but with an enhanced version of the AN/APG-63 radar on the F-15A. These featured folding wingtips, reinforced landing gear and a stronger tailhook for shipboard operation.
F-15E Strike Eagle
Two-seat all-weather multirole strike version, fitted with conformal fuel tanks. It was developed into the F-15I, F-15S, F-15K, F-15SG, F-15SA, and other variants. Over 400 F-15E and derivative variants produced since 1985; still in production.
F-15SE Silent Eagle
In March 2009 Boeing unveiled the F-15SE, a Proposed F-15E variant with a reduced radar cross-section via changes such as replacing conformal fuel tanks with conformal weapons bays and canting the twin vertical tails 15 degrees outward, which would reduce their radar signature while providing a slight boost to lift to help offset the loss of conformal fuel tanks.
F-15 2040C
Proposed upgrade to the F-15C, allowing it to supplement the F-22 in the air superiority role. The 2040C concept is an evolution of the Silent Eagle proposed to South Korea and Israel, with some low-observable improvements but mostly a focus on the latest air capabilities and lethality. Proposal includes infra-red search and track, doubling the number of weapon stations, with quad racks for a maximum of 16 air-to-air missiles, Passive/Active Warning Survivability System, conformal fuel tanks, upgraded APG-63(v)3 AESA and a "Talon HATE" communications pod allowing data transfer with the F-22.

Prototypes

Twelve prototypes were built and used for trials by the F-15 Joint Test Force at Edwards Air Force Base using McDonnell Douglas and United States Air Force personnel. Most prototypes were later used by NASA for trials and experiments.
F-15A-1, AF Serial No. 71-0280
Was the first F-15 to fly on 11 July 1972 from Edwards Air Force Base, it was used as a trial aircraft for exploring the flight envelope, general handling and testing the carriage of external stores.
F-15A-1, AF Ser. No. 71-0281
The second prototype first flew on 26 September 1972 and was used to test the F100 engine.
F-15A-2, AF Ser. No. 71-0282
First flew on 4 November 1972 and was used to test the APG-63 radar and avionics.
F-15A-2, AF Ser. No. 71-0283
First flew on 13 January 1973 and was used as a structural test aircraft, it was the first aircraft to have the smaller wingtips to clear a severe buffet problem found on earlier aircraft.
F-15A-2, AF Ser. No. 71-0284
First flew on 7 March 1973 it was used for armament development and was the first aircraft fitted with an internal cannon.
F-15A-3, AF Ser. No. 71-0285
First flew on 23 May 1973 and was used to test the missile fire control system and other avionics.
F-15A-3, AF Ser. No. 71-0286
First flew on 14 June 1973 and was used for armament trials and testing external fuel stores.
F-15A-4, AF Ser. No. 71-0287
First flew on 25 August 1973 and was used for spin recovery, angle of attack and fuel system testing, it was fitted with an anti-spin recovery parachute. The aircraft was loaned to NASA from 1976 for engine development trials.
F-15A-4, AF Ser. No. 71-0288
First flew on 20 October 1973 and was used to test integrated aircraft and engine performance, it was later used by McDonnell Douglas as a test aircraft in the 1990s.
F-15A-4, AF Ser. No. 71-0289
First flew on 30 January 1974 and was used for trials on the radar, avionics and electronic warfare systems.
F-15B-1, AF Ser. No. 71-0290
The first two-seat prototype originally designated the TF-15A, it first flew on 7 July 1973.
F-15B-2, AF Ser. No. 71-0291
First flew on 18 October 1973 as a TF-15A and used as a test and demonstration aircraft. In 1976 it made an overseas sales tour painted in markings to celebrate the bicentenary of the United States.  Also used as the development aircraft for the F-15E as well as the first F-15 to use Conformal Fuel Tanks.

Research and test

F-15 Streak Eagle (AF Ser. No.72-0119)
An unpainted F-15A stripped of most avionics demonstrated the fighter's acceleration capabilities. The aircraft broke eight time-to-climb world records between 16 January and 1 February 1975 at Grand Forks AFB, ND. It was delivered to the National Museum of the United States Air Force in December 1980.

F-15 STOL/MTD (AF Ser. No. 71-0290)
The first F-15B was converted into a short takeoff and landing, maneuver technology demonstrator aircraft. In the late 1980s it received canard flight surfaces in addition to its usual horizontal tail, along with square thrust-vectoring nozzles. It was used as a short-takeoff/maneuver-technology demonstrator (S/MTD).
F-15 ACTIVE (AF Ser. No. 71-0290)
The F-15 S/MTD was later converted into an advanced flight control technology research aircraft with thrust vectoring nozzles.
F-15 IFCS (AF Ser. No. 71-0290)
The F-15 ACTIVE was then converted into an intelligent flight control systems research aircraft. F-15B 71-0290 was the oldest F-15 still flying when retired in January 2009.
F-15 MANX
Concept name for a tailless variant of the F-15 ACTIVE, but the NASA ACTIVE experimental aircraft was never modified to be tailless.
F-15 Flight Research Facility (AF Ser. No. 71-0281 and AF Ser. No. 71-0287)
Two F-15A aircraft were acquired in 1976 for use by NASA's Dryden Flight Research Center for numerous experiments such as: Highly Integrated Digital Electronic Control (HiDEC), Adaptive Engine Control System (ADECS), Self-Repairing and Self-Diagnostic Flight Control System (SRFCS) and Propulsion Controlled Aircraft System (PCA). 71-0281, the second flight-test F-15A, was returned to the Air Force and became a static display at Langley AFB in 1983.
F-15B Research Testbed (AF Ser. No. 74-0141)
Acquired in 1993, it was an F-15B modified and used by NASA's Dryden Flight Research Center for flight tests.

Operators

This article only covers the F-15A, B, C, D, and related variants. For the operators of other F-15E-based variants, like the F-15E, F-15I, F-15S, F-15K, F-15SG, or F-15EX, see McDonnell Douglas F-15E Strike Eagle.

 Israeli Air Force has operated F-15s since 1977. The IAF has 84 F-15A/B/C/D/I aircraft in service as of 2022.

 Japan Air Self-Defense Force operates 200 Mitsubishi F-15J and F-15DJ fighters produced under license by Mitsubishi Heavy Industries.

 Royal Saudi Air Force has 211 F-15C/D/SA fighters in operation as of 2022. 

 United States Air Force operates 168 F-15C and 18 F-15D total aircraft as of mid-2022.
 NASA currently operates one F-15B #836 as a test bed for a variety of flight research experiments and two F-15D, #884 and #897, for research support and pilot proficiency. NASA in the past used an F-15B #835 to test Highly Integrated Digital Engine Control system (HIDEC) at Edwards AFB in 1988.

Notable accidents

A total of 175 F-15s have been lost to non-combat causes as of June 2016. However, the F-15 aircraft is very reliable with only 1 loss per 50,000 flight hours.
 On 1 May 1983, an Israeli Air Force F-15D collided mid-air with an A-4 Skyhawk during a training flight, causing the F-15's right wing to shear off almost completely. Despite the damage, the pilot was able to reach a nearby airbase and land safely – albeit at twice the normal landing speed. The aircraft was subsequently repaired and saw further combat action.
 On 26 March 2001, two US Air Force F-15Cs crashed near the summit of Ben Macdui in the Cairngorms during a low flying training exercise over the Scottish Highlands. Both Lieutenant Colonel Kenneth John Hyvonen and Captain Kirk Jones died in the accident, which resulted in a court martial for an RAF air traffic controller, who was later found not guilty.
 On 2 November 2007, a 27-year-old F-15C (AF Ser. No. 80-0034) of the 131st Fighter Wing, Missouri Air National Guard, crashed following an in-flight breakup due to structural failure during combat training near St. Louis, Missouri. The pilot, Major Stephen W. Stilwell, ejected but suffered serious injuries. On 3 November 2007, all non-mission critical F-15s were grounded pending the crash investigation's outcome. By 13 November 2007, over 1,100 F-15s were grounded worldwide after Israel, Japan and Saudi Arabia grounded their aircraft as well. F-15Es were cleared on 15 November 2007 pending individual inspections. On 8 January 2008, the USAF cleared 60 percent of the F-15A/B/C/D fleet to fly. On 10 January 2008, the accident review board released its report, which attributed the crash to the longeron not meeting specifications. On 15 February 2008, the Air Force cleared all F-15s for flight, pending inspections and any needed repairs. In March 2008, Stilwell filed a lawsuit against Boeing which was later dismissed in April 2009.

Specifications (F-15C)

Aircraft on display
Although the F-15 continues to in use, a number of older USAF and IAF models have been retired, with several placed on outdoor display or in museums.

Germany
F-15A
 74-0085 – Spangdahlem AB
 74-0109 – Auto Technik Museum, Speyer

Netherlands
F-15A
 74-0083 (marked as 77–0132) – Nationaal Militair Museum, Kamp Zeist, former Camp New Amsterdam AB. Aircraft was based at Camp New Amsterdam and left as a gift when the base was closed in 1995.

Japan
F-15A
 74-0088 – Kadena AB

Israel
F-15A
 73-0098 – Israeli Air Museum, Hatzerim
 73-0107 – gate guard at Tel Nof AB

Saudi Arabia
F-15D
 Royal Saudi Air Force Museum

United Kingdom

F-15A
 74-0131 – Wings of Liberty Memorial Park, RAF Lakenheath
 76-0020 – American Air Museum, Duxford

United States

F-15A
 71-0280 – 37th Training Wing HQ Parade Ground, Kelly Field (formerly Kelly AFB), San Antonio, Texas
 71-0281 – Tactical Air Command Memorial Park, Joint Base Langley-Eustis, Hampton, Virginia
 71-0283 – Defense Supply Center Richmond, Richmond, Virginia
 71-0285 – Boeing Avionic Antenna Laboratory, St. Charles, Missouri
 71-0286 – A GF-15A; Saint Louis Science Center, St. Louis, Missouri, in storage.  Previously on display at Octave Chanute Aerospace Museum, Rantoul, Illinois
 72-0119 "Streak Eagle" – in storage at the National Museum of the United States Air Force, Wright-Patterson AFB, Dayton, Ohio
 73-0085 – Museum of Aviation, Robins AFB, Warner Robins, Georgia
 73-0086 – Louisiana Military Museum, Jackson Barracks, New Orleans, Louisiana
 73-0099 (Marked as 77–0099) – Robins AFB, Warner Robins, Georgia
 74-0081 – Elmendorf AFB, Alaska
 74-0084 – Alaska Aviation Heritage Museum, Anchorage, Alaska
 74-0095 – Tyndall AFB, Panama City, Florida  This aircraft was flipped and severely damaged by Hurricane Michael in October 2018.
 74-0114 – Mountain Home AFB, Idaho
 74-0117 – Langley AFB, Virginia
 74-0118 – Pima Air & Space Museum, Tucson, Arizona
 74-0119 – Castle Air Museum, Atwater, California
 74-0124 – Air Force Armament Museum, Eglin AFB, Florida
 75-0026 – National Warplane Museum, Elmira Corning Regional Airport, New York
 75-0033 – Eglin Parkway entrance to 33d Fighter Wing complex, Eglin AFB, Florida
 75-0045 – USS Alabama Battleship Memorial Park, Mobile, Alabama
 76-0008 – March Field Air Museum at March ARB, Riverside, California
 76-0009 – Kingsley Field Air National Guard Base, Klamath Falls, Oregon
 76-012 -- Air Heritage Museum, Beaver County Airport, Beaver Falls, PA
 76-0014 – Evergreen Aviation Museum, McMinnville, Oregon
 76-0018 – Hickam Field, Joint Base Pearl Harbor–Hickam, Oahu, Hawaii
 76-0024 – Peterson Air and Space Museum, Peterson AFB, Colorado
 76-0027 – National Museum of the United States Air Force, Wright-Patterson AFB, Dayton, Ohio
 76-0037 – Holloman AFB, New Mexico
 76-0040 – Otis ANGB, Cape Cod, Massachusetts
 76-0042 - United States Air Force Academy, Colorado Springs, Colorado
 76-0048 – McChord Air Museum, McChord AFB, Washington
 76-0063 – Pacific Aviation Museum, Ford Island, Joint Base Pearl Harbor–Hickam, Hawaii
 76-0066 – Portland Air National Guard Base, Oregon
 76-0067 – Dyess Air Force Base, Linear Air Park display area on base
 76-0076 (Marked as 33rd Fighter Wing F-15C 85–0125) – roadside park, DeBary, Florida
 76-0080 – Jacksonville Air National Guard Base, Florida
 76-0088 – 131st Bomb Wing Heritage Park, Whiteman AFB, Missouri
 76-0108 – Lackland AFB/Kelly Field Annex, Texas
 76-0110 – gate guard, Mountain Home AFB, Idaho
 77-0068 – Arnold AFB, Manchester, Tennessee
 77-0084 – 412th Test Wing at Edwards Air Force Base, California and Nellis Air Force Base, Nevada
 77-0090 – Hill Aerospace Museum, Hill AFB, Utah
 77-0102 – Pacific Coast Air Museum, Charles M. Schulz-Sonoma County Airport, Santa Rosa, California. One of two Massachusetts Air National Guard 102d Fighter Wing aircraft scrambled in first response to terrorist air attacks on 11 September 2001
 77-0146 – Veterans Park, Callaway, Florida
 77-0150 – Yanks Air Museum, Chino, California

F-15B
 73-0108 – Luke AFB, Arizona
 73-0114 – Air Force Flight Test Center Museum, Edwards AFB, California
 75-0084 – Russell Military Museum, Russell, Illinois
 77-0161 – Seymour Johnson AFB, Goldsboro, North Carolina

F-15C
 79-0022 – Pueblo Weisbrod Aircraft Museum, Pueblo, Colorado Credited with a MiG-23 kill during Operation Desert Storm while flown by Donald Watros. It is painted in the colors of the 22nd Fighter Squadron deployed from Bitburg AB, Germany to Incirlik AB, Turkey.
 79-0078 – Museum of Aviation, Robins AFB, Warner Robins, Georgia Currently stored at the museum awaiting restoration and display.  Credit with two MiG-21 kills during Operation Desert Storm while flown by Thomas Dietz while on deployment with 53rd Fighter Squadron to Al Kharj AB, Saudi Arabia from Bitburg AB, Germany
 80-0014 – Chico Air Museum, Chico, California; transported from Langley AFB, Virginia

Notable appearances in media

The F-15 was the subject of the IMAX movie Fighter Pilot: Operation Red Flag, about the RED FLAG exercises. In Tom Clancy's nonfiction book, Fighter Wing: A Guided Tour of an Air Force Combat Wing (1995), a detailed analysis of the Air Force's premier fighter aircraft, the F-15 Eagle and its capabilities are showcased.

The F-15 has also been a popular subject as a toy, and a fictional likeness of an aircraft similar to the F-15 has been used in cartoons, books, video games, animated television series, and animated films.

See also

References

Notes

Citations

Bibliography
 Aloni, Shlomo. Israeli F-15 Eagle Units in Combat (Osprey Combat Aircraft #67). Oxford, UK: Osprey Publishing Limited, 2006. .
 Bowman, Martin W. US Military Aircraft. London: Bison Books, 1980. .
 Davies, Steve. Boeing F-15E Strike Eagle, All-Weather Attack Aircraft. London: Airlife Publishing, Ltd., 2003. .
 Davies, Steve. Combat Legend, F-15 Eagle and Strike Eagle. London: Airlife Publishing, Ltd., 2002. .
 Davies, Steve. F-15C/E Eagle Units of operation Iraqi Freedom (Osprey Combat Aircraft #47). Oxford, UK: Osprey Publishing Limited, 2004. .
 Davies, Steve and Doug Dildy. F-15 Eagle Engaged, The World's Most Successful Jet Fighter. Oxford, UK: Osprey Publishing Limited, 2007. .
 Eden, Paul and Soph Moeng, eds. The Complete Encyclopedia of World Aircraft. London: Amber Books Ltd., 2002. .
 Gething, Michael J. F-15 Eagle (Modern Fighting Aircraft). New York: Arco, 1983. .
 Green, William and Gordon Swanborough. The Complete Book of Fighters. New York: Barnes & Noble Inc., 1988. .
 Gunston, Bill. American Warplanes. New York: Crescent Books. 1986. .
 Huenecke, Klaus. Modern Combat Aircraft Design. Annapolis, Maryland: Naval Institute Press, 1987. .
 Jenkins, Dennis R. F/A-18 Hornet: A Navy Success Story. New York: McGraw-Hill, 2000, pp. 1–8. .
 Jenkins, Dennis R. McDonnell Douglas F-15 Eagle, Supreme Heavy-Weight Fighter. Hinckley, UK: Midland Publishing, 1998. .
 Lambert, Mark, ed. Jane's All the World's Aircraft 1993–94. Alexandria, Virginia: Jane's Information Group Inc., 1993. .
 
 Scutts, Jerry. Supersonic Aircraft of USAF. New York: Mallard Press, 1989. .
 Spick, Mike, ed. The Great Book of Modern Warplanes. St. Paul, Minnesota: MBI, 2000. .

Further reading
 Braybrook, Roy. F-15 Eagle. London: Osprey Aerospace, 1991. .
 Crickmore, Paul. McDonnell Douglas F-15 Eagle (Classic Warplanes series). New York: Smithmark Books, 1992. .
 Drendel, Lou. Eagle (Modern Military Aircraft Series). Carrollton, Texas: Squadron/Signal Publications, 1985. .
 Drendel, Lou and Don Carson. F-15 Eagle in action. Carrollton, Texas: Squadron/Signal Publications, 1976. .
 Fitzsimons, Bernard. Modern Fighting Aircraft, F-15 Eagle. London: Salamander Books Ltd., 1983. .
 Gething, Michael J. and Paul Crickmore. F-15 (Combat Aircraft series). New York: Crescent Books, 1992. .
 Kinzey, Bert. The F-15 Eagle in Detail & Scale (Part 1, Series II). El Paso, Texas: Detail & Scale, Inc., 1978. .
 Rininger, Tyson V. F-15 Eagle at War. Minneapolis, Minnesota: Zenith Press, 2009. .

External links

 F-15 Eagle USAF Fact Sheet
 F-15 Eagle history page on Boeing.com
 McDonnell Douglas F-15A, and F-15C on USAF National Museum web site
 F-15 Eagle in service with Israel
 The McDonnell Douglas F-15 Eagle page on Vectorsite.net

1970s United States fighter aircraft
Aircraft first flown in 1972
F-15 Eagle
F-015 Eagle
Twinjets
Fourth-generation jet fighter
Twin-tail aircraft